El Querforadat is a locality located in the municipality of Cava, Lleida, in Province of Lleida province, Catalonia, Spain. As of 2020, it has a population of 14.

Geography 
El Querforadat is located 163km northeast of Lleida.

References

Populated places in the Province of Lleida